Osman Bashiru (born 5 May 1989, in Kumasi) is a Ghanaian professional association football player who last played for Brunei DPMM FC in the 2012 S.League.

Career 
Bashiru arrived to Israeli club Hapoel Petah Tikva as part of a loan agreement with his club in Ghana. While he faltered early, he managed to improve as time went by with Hapoel and the club is going to pick up the option to purchase him for US $100,000.

Osman transferred to Brunei DPMM FC as the Brunei team were preparing for their readmission to the 2012 S.League.

Osman returned to Ghana in 2013 and signed a season's deal with Kumasi Asante Kotoko helping them to the championship that season but lack of enough playing time meant the striker will sign for regional rivals Obuasi Ashantigold in the summer of 2014

Career statistics

Honours

Team
 2012 Singapore League Cup Champions with Brunei DPMM FC
 2012 S.League Runner-Up with Brunei DPMM FC

Footnotes

External links 
Profile at Footballdatabase.eu

1989 births
Living people
Association football forwards
Ghanaian footballers
King Faisal Babes FC players
Hapoel Petah Tikva F.C. players
Hapoel Ashkelon F.C. players
Sektzia Ness Ziona F.C. players
Hapoel Herzliya F.C. players
DPMM FC players
Asante Kotoko S.C. players
Ashanti Gold SC players
Israeli Premier League players
Liga Leumit players
Footballers from Kumasi
Ghanaian expatriate footballers
Expatriate footballers in Israel
Expatriate footballers in Brunei
Ghanaian expatriate sportspeople in Israel
Ghanaian expatriate sportspeople in Brunei